Caliprobola aurea is a species of hoverfly in the family Syrphidae.

Distribution
The species is found in Turkmenistan.

References

Eristalinae
Insects described in 1910
Diptera of Asia
Taxa named by Pius Sack